State of The Ark was released on 27 December 2004 and is the third studio album from the Swedish rock band the Ark, and their final as a quintet. In it, the band's sound became more synthesizer-flavoured and keyboard-oriented, a departure from the more organic glam rock sound of the first two albums. Three singles were released from the album: "One of Us Is Gonna Die Young", "Clamour for Glamour" and "Trust Is Shareware", the latter being a new recording specifically made for single release. "This Piece of Poetry Is Meant to Do Harm" appears in John Cameron Mitchell's film Shortbus and the band has stated that "Hey Kwanongoma!" was inspired by the marimba piece "Rugare 2" by Alport Mhlanga.

Track listing
All songs were written by Ola Salo, except where noted.
"This Piece of Poetry Is Meant to Do Harm" – 3:27
"Rock City Wankers" – 4:10
"Clamour for Glamour" – 3:09
"One of Us Is Gonna Die Young" – 3:28
"Let Me Down Gently" – 2:55
"Hey Kwanongoma!" – 4:48
"The Others" – 3:27
"Girl You're Gonna Get 'Em (Real Soon)" – 3:27
"Deliver Us from Free Will" – 5:06
"No End" (Music: Lars Ljungberg, Lyrics: Ola Salo) – 3:24
"Trust Is Shareware" – 4:25

Personnel

The Ark
Ola Salo – lead vocals, percussion, keyboards
Martin Axén – rhythm guitar, backing vocals
Mikael Jepson – lead guitar
Lars "Leari" Ljungberg – bass
Sylvester Schlegel – drums, backing vocals

Additional musicians
Jens Andersson – producer, sound engineer, additional percussion, keyboards
Åsa Håkansson – strings
Mattias Rodrick – strings
Anna Rocén – strings
Erika Lilja – backing vocals
Maria Lilja – backing vocals
Erik Hjärpe – voice synthesizing

Charts

Weekly charts

Year-end charts

References

The Ark (Swedish band) albums
2005 albums
Virgin Records albums